Scoparia lychnophanes is a species of moth in the family Crambidae.  It is endemic to New Zealand.

Taxonomy
It was described by Edward Meyrick in 1927. However the placement of this species within the genus Scoparia is in doubt. As a result, this species has also been referred to as Scoparia (s.l.) lychnophanes.

Description
The wingspan is about 22 mm. The forewings are dark fuscous with some scattered whitish and ochreous scales. The first and second lines are indicated by shades of scattered white-scales. The hindwings are grey, somewhat darker posteriorly. Adults have been recorded on wing in January.

References

Moths described in 1927
Moths of New Zealand
Scorparia
Endemic fauna of New Zealand
Taxa named by Edward Meyrick
Endemic moths of New Zealand